Sir Walter Nash  (12 February 1882 – 4 June 1968) was a New Zealand politician who served as the 27th prime minister of New Zealand in the Second Labour Government from 1957 to 1960. He is noted for his long period of political service, having been associated with the New Zealand Labour Party since its creation.

Nash was born in Kidderminster, England, and is the most recent New Zealand prime minister to be born outside the country. He arrived in New Zealand in 1909, soon joined the original Labour Party, and became a member of the party's executive in 1919. Nash was elected to Parliament in the Hutt by-election of 1929. He was from the moderate wing of the Labour Party. Appointed as minister of finance in 1935, Nash guided the First Labour Government's economic recovery programme during the Great Depression and then directed the government's wartime controls. He succeeded Peter Fraser as leader of the Labour Party and leader of the Opposition in 1951.

The Second Labour Government's "Black Budget" of 1958, in response to a balance of payments crisis, increased taxes on luxuries such as beer and tobacco. Leaving office at 78 years of age, Nash is to date New Zealand's most elderly prime minister.

Early life
Nash was born in Kidderminster, a town in the English county of Worcestershire. He was born into a poor family and his father was an alcoholic. Nash performed well at school and won a scholarship to King Charles I Grammar School but additional costs associated with attending prevented him from accepting. Nash began employment as a clerk, initially with a lawyer in Kidderminster and then at a factory near Birmingham.

On 16 June 1906, Nash married Lottie May Eaton and established a shop. He became highly active in his community, participating in a large number of societies and clubs. He also attended night school to further his education. By 1908, however, problems began to arise; his wife and son were both ill and a daughter died at birth. In addition an economic recession in the following year seriously harmed his business. The family decided to leave England, settling on New Zealand as a destination.

After arriving in Wellington, in May 1909, Nash became secretary to a local tailor. His wife had two more sons. Nash's religious and political beliefs also began to solidify at this point, with the strong Christian faith he received from his mother being merged with a growing belief in socialism. Nash would remain a "Christian Socialist" for the remainder of his life, believing that the two components were inseparable. His political opinions were influenced by his friendship with prominent New Zealand socialists such as Michael Joseph Savage, Bob Semple and Harry Holland. Nash also became a committed pacifist.

Nash's financial situation deteriorated, however, when the tailor's firm that he worked for (and was a shareholder of) declined. Nash and his family moved to Palmerston North where he became a salesman for a wool and cloth merchant. Later he established a tailoring company in New Plymouth along with Bill Besley, a tailor from Stratford, although the business performed poorly.

Early political career

Nash had briefly been involved with the first Labour Party, established in 1910, but this association had been interrupted by his financial difficulties. In 1918, however, he helped to establish the New Plymouth branch of the modern Labour Party and he became highly active. The following year Nash was elected to the party's national executive.

In 1920 Nash and his wife travelled to Europe, attending various socialist conferences. When they returned to New Zealand, in January 1921, Nash was fined for importing "seditious literature". Despite the reputation that this fine gave him, among his fellow socialists, Nash was one of the more moderate members of the Labour Party. In 1922, a year after he had returned to Wellington, Nash was elected national secretary of the Labour Party. On arrival the party was found to have an all up debt of £220. The debt was settled when, together with Nash's own loan, John Glover (manager of Maori Lands) lent some £100 interest free.

He is often credited with turning the Labour Party into a fully functioning entity; establishing an efficient organisational structure and paying off the party's debts. Following his announcement of "" in the Maoriland Worker he worked hard to increase the party's membership. He also established a permanent national office for the party after party delegates voted to establish one at the 1922 annual conference. Having a centralised location to coordinate party activities and election campaigns was seen as a vital step up to Labour becoming a major political party in New Zealand.

He also contested the Wellington mayoralty in 1929. In Parliament Nash became one of Labour's main finance spokesmen.

Minister of Finance

When Labour, led by Michael Joseph Savage, won the 1935 election Nash was appointed to Cabinet as Minister of Finance, although he also held a number of more minor positions. His other portfolios were Minister of Customs, Minister of Statistics, Minister of Marketing, Minister of Revenue and Minister for Social Security. He was ranked third in the First Labour Government, with only Savage and Peter Fraser above him. Soon after its election the government gave a "Christmas bonus" of £270,000 to the unemployed and needy.

New Zealand's economy was in poor shape at the time of Nash's appointment as Finance Minister and he was very busy for the early part of his ministerial career. Nash introduced a number of substantial changes, in an attempt to improve the situation. He reintroduced a graduated land tax at high rates and supervised the nationalisation of the Reserve Bank of New Zealand. Although some unemployment persisted, rising export prices helped the government to implement its election policies which saw them restore wage cuts, expand pensions, guarantee farmers' prices and revalue the currency. In 1936 Nash departed for England to conduct trade negotiations. The negotiations were only partially successful with an agreement reached over New Zealand's meat prices for beef and lamb exports. He also visited other European capitals, particularly Berlin and Moscow, to determine whether there was scope for trade agreements there. He reached a bilateral trade deal with Germany to export butter there. He also went to Copenhagen to study the Danish system of exchange controls, and had further fruitless trade talks in both Paris and Amsterdam.

Nash resisted the immigration of Jewish refugees to New Zealand, citing a concern that "anti-Semitism, never far from the surface, was very apt to emerge in the case of the talented race whose members can often beat us at our own game, especially the game of money making."

After returning to New Zealand he became involved in disputes within the Labour Party about economic policy. In particular he was heavily criticised by supporters of the Social Credit movement who wanted their views adopted as Labour Party policy. Nash was also attacked by the more radical socialists in the party who saw Nash's pragmatic economic policies as too moderate. Nash, however, was supported by both Savage and Fraser and emerged relatively unscathed. He gained the additional responsibility of implementing Labour's social security plan. Nash himself had limited involvement the formulation of Labour's economic reform policies, however he was largely responsible for putting them into effect, with other ministers relying on him for his attention to detail.

Immediately following Labour's re-election at the 1938 general election New Zealand experienced an exchange crisis with its reserves of sterling funds falling. The orthodox economic response given to the government to call up overdrafts and cut spending to reduce demand and increase unemployment was rejected by the government. Nash instead stated the government would react by introducing exchange controls and import selection which he stated in January 1939 would allow the country to maintain its living standards while ensuring the country could live within its income. Nash was already well familiar with exchange controls systems, having studied the Danish system while in Europe in 1937 and had wished to implement them in New Zealand earlier, but thought they was no immediate need until now. Other colleagues (such as John A. Lee and Mark Woolf Silverstone) felt the main reason this decision had been delayed was to not frighten voters too soon ahead of the election with radical economic repositioning. Prime Minister Savage informed the public that exchange controls were introduced to 'insulate' the country from unfair overseas competition and to encourage industrial development locally.

Nash's proposals (which conflicted with agreements at 1932's British Empire Economic Conference) to control primary produce marketing and make trade agreements so as to determine what would be imported and in what quantities were criticised strongly abroad even being labelled as 'economic totalitarianism' by a British Department of Overseas Trade memorandum. In the immediate period before the exchange controls system could be established, borrowing would be necessary and Nash returned to Britain in April 1939 to seek loans and to reassure (in vain) that existing British exports would not be harmed. He spent over two months in negotiations to hostile officials who were fearful of losing New Zealand as an export market. Nash attempted to compromise suggesting that British manufacturers could take advantage of import regulations by establishing branch factories in New Zealand. This proposal, that British manufacturers should export themselves rather than their products, a method Nash thought New Zealand could industrialize with minimal need for borrowing, was rejected. Eventually he secured loan of £16 million, but was subject to very harsh terms, which required it to be repaid in five annual instalments. Many British newspapers wrote that the terms were "impossibly onerous; indeed blackmailing."

With loans secured Nash sailed home, stopping in Washington, D.C. en route and met with President Franklin D. Roosevelt to discuss defence arrangements in the event of a war. Several days later war was declared between Britain (and New Zealand) against Germany. The British government cabled that it wished to purchase New Zealand's entire exportable surplus of meat. The following day they likewise requested to buy New Zealand's entire exports of dairy produce. Nash took some quiet ironical satisfaction that the government that had been so hostile to his policies and negotiated so unfairly was now so desperate for the bulk sales it had earlier denied. Over the next few months New Zealand's sterling reserves built up with haste allowing its economic stability to quickly recover which also gave it more than enough money to repay the recent loan.

With Savage seriously ill, the first years of World War II were difficult for the Labour Party. Further problems were caused by John A. Lee, a Labour Party member who launched strong attacks on its economic policy. Lee was particularly vicious towards Savage and Nash. Peter Fraser became Prime Minister after Savage's death and Lee was expelled. Nash, himself, reluctantly abandoned his earlier pacifism, deeming the war a necessary one. Nash was appointed Minister from New Zealand in the United States as New Zealand's diplomatic representative in the United States in 1942, but as Minister of Finance frequently returned to Wellington. So Geoffrey Cox the chargé d'affairs was head of the legation for 11 of the 21 months that Cox was in the United States. Nash was difficult to work for: he was unable to delegate and accumulated files before making a decision, and was inconsiderate of staff.

At the end of the war Nash attended the conferences to create the United Nations and also recommended that New Zealand join the International Monetary Fund. He also travelled as New Zealand's representative to several major post-war international conferences concerned with reconstruction, (such as the Bretton Woods Conference and the initial 1948 General Agreement on Tariffs and Trade).

As the 1949 election approached, however, the Labour government was becoming increasingly unpopular. Industrial strife and inflation were major causes. In the election the opposition National Party, led by Sidney Holland, won power.

Leader of the Opposition

Shortly after the election Fraser died and Nash was elected leader of the Labour Party unopposed. While Nash was seen as the likely replacement for Fraser, as acting leader, he brought the election of leader to before the imminent by-election for Fraser's seat of Brooklyn. The Brooklyn by-election was to be contested by former cabinet minister and party president Arnold Nordmeyer (who had lost his seat in the 1949 election) and thus Nordmeyer was unable to contest as only elected members of the caucus were eligible to stand. Nash's decision on the election date caused an argument in caucus, being seen by some as self-motivated, although eventually MPs voted to proceed with the early vote by a majority of two.

The first major test of his leadership came with the waterfront dispute of the same year, where major strikes were damaging the economy. Labour's position on the matter was seen as indecisive—the party was condemned by many workers for giving them insufficient support but at the same time was condemned by the business community for being "soft" on the communist-influenced unions. Labour suffered badly in the snap election that Holland called in 1951 to reaffirm his mandate. The scale of Labour's election loss soon put Nash's leadership under pressure.

As Leader of the Opposition Nash is not generally regarded as having been a success. His primary talent appeared to have been in organisation and finance, and not in the inspirational leadership that Savage and Fraser provided. He was also seen as too slow in coming to decisions. In 1954 several MPs attempted an abortive coup to remove the 71-year-old Nash as leader. They included Rex Mason, Bill Anderton and Arnold Nordmeyer. Nash was told by Mason that number of members had complained about the leadership of the party to him and that Mason thought that the majority wanted a new leader. In 1954 a majority of the caucus was in favour of a new leader but pressure from the unions and continued support from Party branches allowed Nash to survive the subsequent vote.

The negative press from the leadership challenge was unhelpful to Labour's position, but Nash rebounded well heading in to the 1954 election. He fought a strong campaign which saw a gain of five seats and virtually levelling the popular vote with National to only 0.2% behind. The advent of the new Social Credit Party (which won 11.2% of the vote, but no seats) was seen as a spoiler and it was claimed by Nash that Social Credit denied Labour victory by diminishing the two-party swing. The gains made in the election were seen as sufficient to justify Nash retaining the leadership, despite some murmurs of a surprise challenge to him by either his deputy Jerry Skinner or Nordmeyer. Added to this was the talent of the new MPs who joined the Labour caucus which added more energy and more diverse experience to Labour, helping gain further momentum.

As the National government began to grow more unpopular Labour regained some of its earlier dynamism. In the 1957 election the party won a narrow victory—41 seats to 39— assisted by its promises of tax rebates and the abolition of compulsory military training. At the age of 75, Nash became Prime Minister of the Second Labour Government.

Prime Minister
 
Nash appointed himself as Minister of Foreign Affairs, Minister of Maori Affairs and Minister of Statistics. Immediately upon taking office the Second Labour Government found the country's financial situation was found to be much worse than the previous government had admitted, particularly with balance of payments a serious concern. Nash decided that drastic measures would be necessary to bring the situation back under control. These measures resulted in the so-called "Black Budget", presented by Arnold Nordmeyer the new Minister of Finance. The budget included significant tax increases and generated widespread public anger. This was fuelled by the National Party claiming that Nash and Nordmeyer were exaggerating the extent of the problem. The fact that the extra taxes were largely on petrol, cigarettes and beer contributed to the image of Nash's government as miserly. The situation was exacerbated by Nash's frequent absences from the country, leaving Nordmeyer and other Labour ministers to defend the government's policies by themselves.

His shift of focus to external affairs away from his previous interests of finance and social welfare were addressed by his biographer that "for Nash, by 1958, the great moral issues were not poverty and social security at home but world affairs, peace and war. He meant to make whatever contribution he could to guiding the world to wiser and more moral courses." He was also well regarded by his peers for his knowledge on geopolitical matters with Australian foreign minister Richard Casey acknowledging that Nash was one of the few world leaders who had any broad and balanced grasp of world affairs: "Mr. Nash spoke with authority and other world statesmen were ready to listen; his views were well informed and liberal and, although occasionally he seemed to be lost in visionary speculations, he arrived in the end at a practical, hard-headed and courageous attitude. Nearly all New Zealanders, whatever their party, were proud to have Mr. Nash representing them overseas."

Nash's main effort in foreign affairs was to revise the trade and tariff terms of Ottawa agreement in 1958. He was also a strong supporter of the Colombo Plan and visited many of the New Zealand-funded Colombo Plan projects in Asia and also attended the Colombo Plan conference at Yogyakarta, Indonesia. The plan was one of his main interests in foreign policy, with aid and economic development for impoverished peoples appealing to his principles. The Nash government also made progress towards the independence of Western Samoa. Nash had previously shown interest in Samoa years earlier during a 1929 uprising where he collected statistics on the matter to evidence Labour's criticism of the then government's handling of matters there. Following the work by the Nash government, Samoa would gain its independence in 1962.

Nash was also criticised for failing to act in the controversy over the 1960 rugby tour of South Africa, a country which was under an Apartheid government. On the insistence of the South Africans the New Zealand team included no Māori players, prompting a petition against the tour supported by almost 10% of New Zealanders. Opposition to the tour was led by the Citizens All Black Tour Association (CABTA) in whose view the exclusion of Māori from a national team was a gross act of racial discrimination. Nash had long been an outspoken critic of apartheid and in 1958, after he became Prime Minister, New Zealand voted against apartheid for the first time at the United Nations. As Nash had personally denounced racism for most of his life it was expected that he would side with the protesters, but he did not. He refused to step in, saying that the matter was for the rugby authorities to decide. In an April 1960 speech Nash defended the decision of the New Zealand Rugby Union stating that it would be unfair to expect Māori to visit South Africa as they would be sure to experience racial discrimination there and also argued that ostracising apartheid would merely accentuate bitterness in South Africa. The decision to exclude Māori was widely reported and condemned in other countries, having an adverse effect on New Zealand's international standing. The domestic political effect was more benign, however, with the opposition National Party also reluctant to see interference in the tour. After the tour had ended Nash told the Rugby Union that in future tours it would be desirable for South Africa accept Māori to avoid a repetition of the controversy. New Zealand did not tour South Africa again until 1970 where Māori players were included.

Against expectations he did not appoint a Māori as Minister of Māori Affairs, appointing himself with Eruera Tirikatene (who had been spokesperson in the portfolio when in opposition) as his associate minister. Nash either had reservations about Tirikatene's ability or was nervous that a Māori appointed as Minister of Māori Affairs might favour his own iwi, of which previous minister Āpirana Ngata had been accused of, in a well-remembered scandal. In any case, following Fraser's example, Nash believed that the best way to show government commitment to Māori was to lend the mana of the office of prime minister to the portfolio. Nash often spoke on marae frequently repeating his belief that "there were no inferior or superior races". Nash was concerned at the fragmentation of Māori land interests and appointed a Public Service Commissioner, Jack Hunn, to act as Secretary for Māori Affairs and "get an accounting of Maori assets and see what we can do with them". This resulted in the famous and contentious 'Hunn report' on the problems and future of Māori which was completed in August 1960. Nash (preoccupied with winning the coming election) told Hunn that he would not have time to study it until after the election. The outcome was that it was left unread and unimplemented until early 1961 when his successor as Minister of Māori affairs, Ralph Hanan published it and it became the basis of National's policy, to the frustration of Nash.

Nash is the only Labour leader who had served as Leader of the Opposition both before and after his tenure as Prime Minister.

Later life and career

Nash, now nearly eighty years old, was not as active as he once had been. Privately he admitted to confidantes that he had noticed his hearing and memory had deteriorated. The death of his wife in 1961 also took its toll. Gradually, calls for him to retire grew more frequent. Nash, however, refused to step down, partly because of a desire to continue his work, and partly due to a reluctance to see Arnold Nordmeyer succeed him. Initially Nash was planning to announce his retirement as leader at Labour's 1962 party conference to clear the way for his deputy Jerry Skinner. By this time the media and public were widely anticipating Skinner to lead Labour at the 1963 election. After Skinner's sudden death (only a week before the 1962 conference) Nash had been forced to change his plans. The media speculated that Skinner had died with the knowledge that the party leadership would soon be his and that the caucus had already approved of his succession, however Nash strongly denied the suggestion. Skinner was replaced by Fred Hackett, who also died before Nash's retirement also ruling him out as a successor. By June 1962 Nash told the caucus that he would resign at the end of the year unless caucus requested otherwise. At the beginning of the final caucus meeting of the year Nash told caucus that he would resign at a caucus meeting in February and he would not be a candidate for re-election. In February 1963 Nash finally retired as leader of the Labour Party and Nordmeyer was chosen to replace him. Nash was the first Labour leader who did not die in office.

Nash was one of the few New Zealand prime ministers who lived and remained in parliament a long time after losing power. He became the elder statesman of the house, and was frequently referred to in the press as the "grand old man" of New Zealand politics. He continued to speak frequently on foreign affairs and still travelled abroad regularly. In 1963 he went to a Commonwealth Parliamentary Conference in Kuala Lumpur and in January 1964 at the age of 81 (to widespread astonishment) he travelled to Antarctica, flying to McMurdo Sound in an American research plane. It was widely reported in newspapers, claiming that he was the oldest man to have reached the South Pole. In 1966 he sailed to England for a three-month holiday with his sister Emily, his first non-parliamentary visit since 1909.

Despite supporting the government decision in 1963 to send a small non-combatant advisory force to South Vietnam, Nash opposed any military involvement in Vietnam. He became active in the protest movement against the Vietnam War, and denounced the bombing of North Vietnam by the United States. He spoke at many teach-ins on the subject around New Zealand's university campuses where he was well received. An old colleague, Ormond Wilson, said that he 'had never heard Walter so clear about an issue' and his outspokenness in opposition to the war did a great deal to restore Nash's reputation with the left wing which had been damaged by his responses to the waterfront dispute and rugby tour to South Africa. Nash believed that Labour's failure to win the 1966 general election was because of its principled anti-Vietnam war policy, despite voters preferring Labour's economic policy to National's.

In late 1966 he had spent three weeks in hospital for treatment on his veins following a demanding travel schedule in that year's election. In mid-May 1968 he was taken to Hutt Hospital for "observation and rest" and few days later he had a heart attack. He died on 4 June 1968. He was awarded a state funeral, the first since Fraser's in 1950. Funds for a children's ward at a hospital in Quy Nhon, Vietnam, were raised to serve as a memorial to him. It fitted with a suggestion of his years earlier that New Zealand's contribution to the Vietnam War should be providing "hospitals rather than artillery".

Honours and awards
In 1935 Nash was awarded the King George V Silver Jubilee Medal. In 1946 he was appointed to the Privy Council. He was appointed a Member of the Order of the Companions of Honour in the 1959 Queen's Birthday Honours and in the 1965 Queen's Birthday Honours he was made a Knight Grand Cross of the Order of St Michael and St George. It took him two years to decide whether he would accept a knighthood in conformity with the principles of the Labour Party. After discussing it first with Nordmeyer and then the party executive he accepted, though he twice declined a life peerage and seat in the House of Lords. In 1957 he also received the highest distinction of the Scout Association of Japan, the Golden Pheasant Award. In 1963 he was awarded an honorary Doctorate of Laws by Victoria University of Wellington.

Honorific eponyms
A number of streets and public facilities have been named in honour of Nash, in various towns in New Zealand as well as his birthplace of Kidderminster in England.  These include:

Nash Road, Mount Roskill, Auckland
 In Taitā, Lower Hutt
 Nash Street
 Walter Nash Park
 Walter Nash Stadium
 Walter Nash Avenue, Kawerau
 Walter Nash Place, Whanganui
 Walter Nash Road East, Kidderminster

Personal life
Nash did not smoke and consumed alcohol in moderation. There are several anecdotes about Nash getting orange juice laced with gin at receptions. When Nordmeyer and Nash were given glasses of orange juice, the teetotal Nordmeyer sipped his and said quietly "I seem to have Mr Nash's". On another social occasion future Prime Minister Robert Muldoon went to take a glass of orange juice, only to be told by the waitress "Oh no, Mr Muldoon, that's for Mr Nash. That's the one with gin in it." 
Sinclair comments that while minister in Washington for 14 months:

[Nash] purchased an excellent cellar from a wealthy man. His cook, Margaret Moore, introduced him to 'old fashioneds' which, so he pretended, consisted of fruit juice. His taste for good food and drink expanded with opportunity – not that this had been lacking, for instance on his missions in the nineteen-thirties. It was generally supposed in New Zealand that Nash was a 'wowser', opposed to such human pleasures. This was so of Fraser, but quite untrue of Nash. He loved his food, and enjoyed good wine and liquor in moderation.

Nash's great-grandson, Stuart Nash entered parliament in 2008 as a list MP for Labour. He was not re-elected in 2011 because of his low list position, but returned to parliament as electorate MP for Napier in 2014 and in 2017 became a cabinet minister.

References

Bibliography

External links

Prime Minister's Office biography 
Walter's World online exhibition from Archives New Zealand
 

|-

|-

|-

|-

|-

|-

|-

|-

|-

|-

|-

|-

Prime Ministers of New Zealand
New Zealand Labour Party MPs
New Zealand finance ministers
New Zealand foreign ministers
New Zealand Labour Party leaders
People from Kidderminster
English emigrants to New Zealand
New Zealand Members of the Order of the Companions of Honour
1882 births
1968 deaths
New Zealand Knights Grand Cross of the Order of St Michael and St George
New Zealand Christian socialists
Leaders of the Opposition (New Zealand)
Members of the New Zealand House of Representatives
New Zealand MPs for Hutt Valley electorates
New Zealand members of the Privy Council of the United Kingdom
Wellington Harbour Board members
Unsuccessful candidates in the 1928 New Zealand general election
Unsuccessful candidates in the 1925 New Zealand general election
New Zealand politicians awarded knighthoods